Sangadji Andreyevich Tarbaev (born 15 April 1982, Elista) is a Russian producer, television host, actor, and politician. He was elected as a deputy to the State Duma in the 2021 Russian legislative election, and serves as chairman of the Committee on Tourism and Tourism Infrastructure Development during the 8th State Duma. 

Prior to his election to the Duma, Tarbaev was a cofounder and producer at Yellow, Black and White, a cofounder of mixed martial arts promotion company Fight Nights Global (now AMC Fight Nights), and director-general of production company My Way Productions. He was also elected to the fifth convocation (2014–17) of the Civic Chamber of the Russian Federation.

Biography 
Sangadji Tarbaev was born in Elista. He graduated from Peoples' Friendship University of Russia in 2005.

Media 
In 2000 started career in KVN (Channel One Russia) as founder and member of comedy team "RUDN" that became champion of The Club in 2006.

In 2007-2008 was one of the television host of TV program Vokrug sveta (channel Russia-1).

Founder and general producer of "Yellow, Black and White" (2008-2012).

Founder and producer of promotion company "Fight Nights Global".

Founder and the general director of company "My Way Production".

KVN 
KVN is one of the largest youth movements in Russia, that shows in TV, Channel One Russia. Exist more than 55 years. Sangadji Tarbaev as founder and member of comic team RUDN that became the most title one team in the KVN. The team have all top awards.

Social activity 
In 2014 was elected in Civic Chamber of the Russian Federation.

Projects 
 Daesh molodezh! 
 Odna za vseh 
 The Uralskiye pelmeni show 
 Igrushki 
 Svetofor 
 Odnazhdi v milicii 
 Kuhnya 
 Kak ya stal russkim

Awards 
 Laureate of the TEFI award in the nomination "The producer of TV show" (Odna za vseh).

See also 
 Channel One Russia
 KVN
 Russia-1
 Vokrug sveta
 Yellow, Black and White
 Comedy team "RUDN"

External links 
 Fight Nights Global — official website
 Yellow, Black and White — official website
 Comedy team "RUDN" — official website
 Vokrug sveta — official website
 Dossier
 Interview

1982 births
Living people
Russian directors
Russian television presenters
Russian screenwriters
Male screenwriters
KVN
Russian people of Kazakhstani descent
Kalmyk people
Eighth convocation members of the State Duma (Russian Federation)